Selino is a rural locality (a village) in Turgenevskoye Rural Settlement, Melenkovsky District, Vladimir Oblast, Russia. The population was 354 as of 2010. There are 4 streets.

Geography 
Selino is located 19 km northeast of Melenki (the district's administrative centre) by road. Turgenevo is the nearest rural locality.

References 

Rural localities in Melenkovsky District